Basil Bretherton (26 April 1917 – 19 July 1997) was an Australian rules footballer who played for the North Melbourne Football Club in the Victorian Football League (VFL).

Notes

External links 

1917 births
1997 deaths
Australian rules footballers from Victoria (Australia)
North Melbourne Football Club players